Live Plus is a live album by American R&B singer Miki Howard, released in the United States on October 24, 1996 through Warlock Records label. Along with performing all of her hit songs, the album also features a tune written by Howard herself, called the "Blues".

Track listing

References

1996 live albums
Miki Howard albums